Olympus is a public art work by American artist Charles Ginnever located at the Lynden Sculpture Garden near Milwaukee, Wisconsin. The sculpture is an abstract made of weathering steel arranged in triangular shapes which rise successively in height; it is installed on the lawn.

References

Outdoor sculptures in Milwaukee
1976 sculptures
Steel sculptures in Wisconsin
Abstract sculptures in Wisconsin
1976 establishments in Wisconsin